Sesamothamnus lugardii, the Transvaal sesame-bush or sesambos, is a species of plant in family Pedaliaceae, endemic to southern Namibia, eastern Botswana, southern Zimbabwe, and Kruger National Park in the Transvaal. It is a soft-stemmed shrub that grows alone or in scattered, small groups in hot, dry areas. The plant can grow to 4 meters in height with a very thick lower trunk, up to 1 meter in diameter, from which arise several thick branches. Flowers are white.

References

 Fl. Trop. Afr. 4: II. 568, 1906.
 JSTOR
 University of Connecticut
 Llifle
 Bihrmann's Caudiciforms

Flora of Botswana
Flora of Namibia
Flora of Zimbabwe
Pedaliaceae
Caudiciform plants
Taxa named by N. E. Brown
Taxa named by Otto Stapf